Deep-sub-voltage nanoelectronics are integrated circuits (ICs) operating near theoretical limits of energy consumption per unit of processing.  These devices are intended to address the needs of applications such as wireless sensor networks which have dramatically different requirements from traditional electronics.  For example, for microprocessors where performance is a primary metric of interest, but for some new devices, energy per instruction has become a more sensible metric.

The important case of fundamental ultimate limit for logic operation is the reversible computing.

The tiny autonomous devices (for example smartdust or autonomous Microelectromechanical systems) are based on deep-sub-voltage nanoelectronics.

References

Meindl J. Low power microelectronics: retrospect and prospect. Proc. IEEE 1995. V.83. NO.4. P. 619-635.
Frank M.P. Reversible computing and truly adiabatic circuits: The next great challenge for digital engineering. Powerpoint slideshow
Meindl J., Davis J. The fundamental limit on binary switching energy for terascale integration (TSI).  IEEE Journal of Solid-State Circuits, 2000. V.35. NO.10. P. 1515-1516.
Itoh K. Ultra-low voltage nano-scale memories.  Springer. 2007.
Silvester D. IC design Strategies at ultra-low voltages 
Cavin R. K., Zhirnov V. V., Herr D. J. C., Avila A., Hutchby J. Research directions and challenges in nanoelectronics.  Journal of Nanoparticle Research, 2006 V.8. P. 841–858.
Hanson S., Zhai B., Bernstein K., Blaauw D., Bryant A., Chang L., Das K. K., Haensch W., Nowak E. J., Sylvester D. M.  Ultra-low-voltage, minimum-energy CMOS.  IBM J. RES. & DEV. 2006.  V. 50. NO. 4/5. P. 469-490.
Alexander Despotuli, Alexandra Andreeva.  High-capacity capacitors for 0.5 voltage nanoelectronics of the future.  Modern Electronics № 7, 2007, P. 24-29 
Alexander Despotuli, Alexandra Andreeva.  A short review on deep-sub-voltage nanoelectronics and related technologies. International Journal of Nanoscience, 2009. V.8. NO.4-5. P. 389-402.

Nanoelectronics